The following is an episode list for the BBC One sitcom Citizen Khan. The show was first broadcast in the United Kingdom on BBC One on 27 August 2012.

Episodes

Series 1 (2012)

Series 2 (2013)
A second series of 6 episodes was recorded at the MediaCityUK in Salford, Greater Manchester, from 6 June to 18 July 2013, and broadcast from 1 October to 8 November.

Christmas Special (2013)

Series 3 (2014)
The third series of Citizen Khan will comprise six episodes, with recordings taking place at Media City Studios in Manchester from 10 August 2014 until 1 October 2014. The third series began on BBC One on Friday 31 October 2014 at 8:30pm.

Christmas Special (2014)

Series 4 (2015)

Christmas Special (2015)

Series 5 (2016)

Christmas Special (2016)

Notes

References

External links
Citizen Khan: Episode Guide at the BBC programmes
Citizen Khan: Episode Guide at the British Comedy Guide

Television episodes about Islam
Lists of British sitcom episodes